Brevundimonas albigilva is a Gram-negative, aerobic and short rod-shaped bacterium from the genus of Brevundimonas which has been isolated from forest soil from the Kyonggi University in Korea.

References

External links
Type strain of Brevundimonas albigilva at BacDive -  the Bacterial Diversity Metadatabase

Bacteria described in 2016
Caulobacterales